George Angus may refer to:

 George Angus (footballer) (1875–1917), Australian rules footballer
 George Angus (printer) (1784–1808), Tyneside printer and publisher
 George Angus (architect) (1792–1845), Scottish architect